David Paul Martindale (born 13 July 1974) is a Scottish football manager who currently manages Scottish Premiership club Livingston.

Martindale did not play for any professional team but did play Junior football for Linlithgow Rose and West Calder United.

Career

Time in prison, first steps in coaching
Unlike most football managers, Martindale  did not play the sport at the professional level. Born in Glasgow, he grew up in Govan and the Craigshill neighbourhood of Livingston, West Lothian and was a youth player with Rangers and Motherwell but by his own admission did not apply himself to make the most of his talents, and was released from a contract with Rangers after fracturing his leg in an unauthorised local match with friends. He played at Junior level for Linlithgow Rose and West Calder United and had business interests in the hospitality sector, but after a pub he owned went on fire without insurance cover he also became heavily involved in organised crime, specifically the large-scale supply of cocaine as well as money laundering. He was arrested in April 2004 following a police operation; while awaiting trial, he enrolled at Heriot-Watt University to undertake a degree in construction project management.

Martindale was imprisoned in November 2006, serving four years (and also having around £100,000-worth of assets seized as proceeds of crime), then completed his degree following his release. In football, he played for Whitburn in the East Region Juniors then became assistant manager at Broxburn Athletic.

Progression at Livingston
In 2014, while employed in the construction industry, he became involved with local professional club Livingston as a part-time volunteer based on personal recommendations and following appropriate background checks, with his work initially consisting of basic training duties and ground maintenance – the club's poor financial state at the time meant they were in need of assistance at minimal cost. Even at that stage, his appointment was scrutinised in local press. He gradually became more involved in coaching and recruitment during Mark Burchill's spell as manager, and also began to study the subject formally, obtaining his UEFA B Licence via the Irish Football Association due to them being more accommodating to applicants with convictions than their Scottish counterparts.

Martindale was appointed assistant manager of Livingston when David Hopkin became manager in January 2016, and when Hopkin departed in May 2018 after leading the club to successive promotions from Scottish League One to the Scottish Premiership, took temporary charge of the team; several signings were made during this summer period (during which he was offered the manager's job but turned it down for concerns of bringing embarrassment to the club due to his past and of being too inexperienced at that point) but no official matches played prior to the appointment of Kenny Miller, who soon resigned in August 2018 to continue his playing career. Martindale again had interim control for a matter of days before Gary Holt took over, keeping Martindale on the staff and handing him increased responsibilities as 'head of football operations'.

Livingston manager
Holt quit as Livingston manager in November 2020 – again deciding to leave despite a relatively successful spell where the Lions comfortably retained their top-flight status in both seasons of his tenure – and Martindale was appointed head coach on an interim basis, alongside Tony Caig. He won four matches in a row during this time (including a 2020–21 Scottish League Cup quarter-final), and was officially appointed manager until the end of the season on 21 December. His side went on to win four subsequent Premiership matches, before securing two draws against title holders Celtic and progressing to the League Cup Final. The Scottish Football Association's 'Fit and proper person' hearing by its Professional Game Board took place on 26 January 2021 with a positive outcome for Martindale, who had been turned down in his application to be a club official a year earlier but was supported publicly by eminent sporting academic Phil Scraton and the local MP Hannah Bardell.
There was also widespread support for Martindale within Scottish football from fans, players and other managers.

Martindale won Scottish Premiership Manager of the Month in November 2022.

Career statistics

Managerial record

Initially caretaker and appointed permanently on 21 December 2020

Honours

Manager
Livingston
 Scottish League Cup runner-up: 2020–21

Individual
Scottish Premiership Manager of the Month: December 2020, January 2021, November 2022

References

External links
 Profile at LinkedIn

1974 births
Living people
Scottish football managers
Scottish footballers
Association football coaches
Scottish Junior Football Association players
West Calder United F.C. players
Linlithgow Rose F.C. players
Whitburn Junior F.C. players
Broxburn Athletic F.C. players
Sportspeople from Glasgow
Sportspeople from Livingston, West Lothian
Scottish Professional Football League managers
Livingston F.C. non-playing staff
Livingston F.C. managers
Scottish drug traffickers
Scottish people convicted of drug offences
British money launderers
People convicted of money laundering
Alumni of Heriot-Watt University
21st-century Scottish criminals
Sportspeople convicted of crimes
Association footballers not categorized by position